Gregory James Baty (born August 28, 1964) is a former American football tight end, who played eight seasons in the National Football League. He played college football at Stanford University.

Career
In the NFL, Baty was selected by the New England Patriots in the eighth round in 1986. However, after being a representative for the players' union during the 1987 players' strike, he was repeatedly picked up but waived by several teams, including the Los Angeles Rams, the Arizona Cardinals, the New York Giants, and the Tampa Bay Buccaneers, before having a longer tenure with the Miami Dolphins.

Personal life
His wife, Kathleen Gallagher Baty, was kidnapped by Lawrence Stagner, a former high school acquaintance, in Menlo Park, California, in May 1990. Through a surprise call from her mother, Kathleen Baty was able to alert the police before her kidnapper was able to take her away from her home. She was promptly rescued and Stagner arrested. Her case was one of several which led to the passage of anti-stalking laws in California. The incident was shown on an episode of Rescue 911 and Obsessed: Dark Obsessions.

Baty has been a resident of Sparta Township, New Jersey.

References

1964 births
Living people
Players of American football from Michigan
American football tight ends
Stanford Cardinal football players
New England Patriots players
Los Angeles Rams players
Miami Dolphins players
People from Sparta, New Jersey
People from Hastings, Michigan